Elizabeth Wallace is an American television writer. She was married to Art Wallace.

Positions held
All My Children 
Writer (1981–1989)

Awards and nominations
Wallace has been nominated for five Daytime Emmy awards for her work on All My Children. She was nominated from 1982 to 1988, and won twice in 1985 and 1988. Her first nomination was shared with Agnes Nixon, Wisner Washam, Jack Wood, Mary K. Wells, Clarice Blackburn, Lorraine Broderick, Cynthia Benjamin, and John Saffron, while her first win was shared with the former minus Benjamin and Saffron, and including Victor Miller, Art Wallace, Susan Kirshenbaum, Elizabeth Page, and Carlina Della Pietra.

References

External links
 

American soap opera writers
Year of birth missing (living people)
Living people
Daytime Emmy Award winners
American women television writers
21st-century American women